Herpetogramma semilaniata is a moth in the family Crambidae. It was described by George Hampson in 1895. It is found on St. Vincent and in Cuba and Costa Rica.

References

Moths described in 1895
Herpetogramma
Moths of the Caribbean
Moths of Central America